was a Japanese businessman in the Shōwa period, president of Kansai Electric Power Company.

In 1997 he received the highest distinction of the Scout Association of Japan, the Golden Pheasant Award.

References

External links

Scouting in Japan
1901 births
2003 deaths